Oliver Bäte (born 1 March 1965) is a German business executive who is the CEO of Allianz, a position he has held since October 2014.

Early life
Bäte graduated from the University of Cologne and New York University Stern School of Business.

Career
Bäte served with the German Air Force from 1986 until 1987.

Bäte started his career with McKinsey & Company in New York. Later, he moved to their offices in Germany. In 1998, he took over McKinsey’s German insurance practice. In 2003, he became Director in charge of the firm’s European insurance and asset management sector.

Bäte joined Allianz’s board in 2008, serving as chief operating officer (COO) and chief financial officer (CFO) before taking responsibility for insurance operations in Western and Southern Europe (France, Benelux, Italy, Greece, Turkey) in 2013. As part of a 2015 executive reshuffle to cut the size of the Allianz management board to nine members, he also took over responsibility for human resources.

In his role at Allianz, Bäte was also part of Chancellor Angela Merkel’s delegation during her 2018 state visit to China.

Other activities

Government agencies 
 Monetary Authority of Singapore (MAS), Member of the International Advisory Panel (since 2015)

Non-profit organizations 
 Baden-Badener Unternehmer-Gespräche (BBUG), Member of the Board of Trustees
 Council on Foreign Relations (CFR), Member of the Global Board of Advisors
 Stifterverband für die Deutsche Wissenschaft, Member of the Board
 Munich Security Conference, Member of the Advisory Council
 Schmalenbach Society, Member of the Advisory Council
 Trilateral Commission, Member of the European Group
 The B Team, Member (since 2016)
 World Economic Forum (WEF), Member of the Stewardship Board of the Initiative on Shaping the Future of Financial and Monetary Systems (2017)
 European Financial Services Roundtable (EFR), Member
 Pan-European Insurance Forum (PEIF), Chairman
 Geneva Association, Vice Chairman
 Institute of International Finance (IFF), Member of the Board

References

1965 births
German chief executives
Living people
New York University Stern School of Business alumni
University of Cologne alumni
McKinsey & Company people